Tanja Bucifal is a Croatian football midfielder currently playing in the Croatian First Division for Rijeka Jackpot. She was a member of the Croatian national team for two years; she made her debut in a 2005 friendly against Macedonia. She scored her only goal for Croatia in the Euro 2009 qualifying 6–0 victory over Georgia.

References

1985 births
Living people
Croatian women's footballers
Croatia women's international footballers
Women's association football midfielders
Croatian Women's First Football League players
ŽNK Rijeka players